Mussidia is a genus of snout moths described by Émile Louis Ragonot in 1888.

Species
 Mussidia fiorii Cecconi & de Joannis, 1911
 Mussidia irisella (Guenée, 1862)
 Mussidia melanoneura Ragonot, 1893
 Mussidia nigrivenella Ragonot, 1888
 Mussidia nigrolineella Roesler & Küppers, 1981
 Mussidia pectinicornella (Hampson, 1896)
 Mussidia physostigmatis Ragonot, 1893
 Mussidia semipectinella (Guenée, 1862)

References

Phycitinae
Taxa named by Émile Louis Ragonot
Pyralidae genera